The women's singles figure skating at the 2007 Asian Winter Games was held on 1 and 2 February 2007 at Changchun Wuhuan Gymnasium, China.

Schedule
All times are China Standard Time (UTC+08:00)

Results
Legend
WD — Withdrawn

References

Results

External links
Schedule

Women